Wissant (from , “white sand”) is a seaside commune in the Pas-de-Calais department in the Hauts-de-France region of France.

Geography

History
Located at the eastern end of a lagoon formed by a storm-breach of the coastal dunes, probably in the mid-10th century, Wissant has been a fishing village for a millennium: along with Audresselles it is the last fishing village in France to use a traditional method of fishing using a wooden boat called a flobart and was in the Middle Ages a major port for embarkation for England: In a mid-11th century Life of St. Vulganius, Wissant was specified,  probably anachronistically, as the natural disembarkation point for the early eighth-century Celtic saint in his evangelizing travels. Wissant was the embarkation port of Robert de Beaumont, 3rd Earl of Leicester, for his ill-fated invasion of England in 1173, with an army of 3000 Flemings. Henry III of England was stranded at Wissant for lack of cash.<ref>Close rolls of the Reign of henry III, 1259-1261 (HMSO, 1934), noted in review by Eileen Power in 'The Economic History Review 5.2 (April 1935:134).</ref> According to Matthew Paris (mid-13th century) its naucleri habitually interfered with English fishing fleets.

From the 7th to the 14th century, the local language was the West Franconian dialect called Old Dutch and the village was called Witsant and reckoned part of Flanders.

Shifting coastal sands silted up the harbour, at the same time that Calais was rising in importance as a port towards the end of the 12th century. At the end of the 19th century, the coastal dunes of Wissant began to be covered with seaside villas. During the 20th century, an entrepreneur, M. Létendart from Calais, extracted sand and gravel from the dunes to the west of Wissant, in the bed of the ancient lagoon. The huge excavations now form lakes and a nature reserve. At the time of the exploitation of these gravel pits, the bones of a complete mammoth  with its tusks were discovered by four workers.

In July 1909 Wissant stood at the centre of worldwide focus. Three contenders for the £1,000 Northcliffe prize offered by the Daily Mail for the first heavier-than-air craft to cross the English channel were camped along the coast between Calais and Wissant. The Franco-Russian Comte Charles de Lambert who had two [[Wright Model A|Wright Flyers]] (Nos. 2 and 18) and was camped at Wissant.. While practising over the dunes he crashed heavily and cancelled his plans. Louis Blériot won the prize and worldwide fame, from his camp at Calais.

Today, because of the frequent and usually favourable winds and the proximity of the TGV railway station and the Eurostar trains to Fréthun, Parisians call Wissant the "Mecca” of surfing.

Notable people
On 1 December 1170, Thomas Becket sailed from Wissant to England, where he was martyred.

Jacques and Pierre de Wissant were, with four others, voluntarily hostages in the siege of Calais during the Hundred Years War. On 4 August 1347 they went barefooted and dressed only with shirts and ropes around their necks to the English king, who had intended to leave them to die as a retaliation for his losses in that siege. Only by Queen Philippa of Hainaut's intervention were the six men saved. Auguste Rodin used this subject for his famous sculpture The Burghers of Calais (1889).

The French President Charles de Gaulle had a small summer house in Wissant that still exists today.

Population

The inhabitants are called Wissantais.

Places of interest
 The church of St Nicholas, dating from the fifteenth century.
 Le Typhonium, a villa built in Egyptian style for the artist Adrien Demont and his wife Virginie Demont-Breton, which later had a tower added on to it by the descendants of the artists.
 Two 17th-century fortified manor houses.
 An old watermill, converted into a museum, now unfortunately closed to the public.
 The Commonwealth War Graves Commission cemetery, which contains the graves of 11 Commonwealth war dead of the Second World War.
 , the wreck of a German WWI submarine, usually hidden beneath sand but visible again in 2019.

See also
 Communes of the Pas-de-Calais department

References

External links

 Official Wissant website 
 A Wissant website 
 The history of Wissant 
 The CWGC cemetery

Communes of Pas-de-Calais
Seaside resorts in France
Morini